Henryk Pillati (19 January 1832 in Warsaw – 16 April 1894 in Warsaw) was a Polish illustrator, caricaturist and history painter, in the Classical style.

Biography 
He was born to a wealthy family. Three years later, both of his parents died during a cholera epidemic. This forced him to leave school and find work to support his surviving younger siblings.

He managed to get by selling small paintings of genre scenes and episodes from the Polish-Swedish wars. From 1852 to 1853, he created a series of large canvases, designed for decorating steamships owned by Count Andrzej Artur Zamoyski, on the Vistula River. The ships were later confiscated by the Russians during the January Uprising.

Later, he received private scholarships that enabled him to spend a year studying at the École des Beaux-Arts in Paris. Four years later, he continued his studies at the Academy of Fine Arts, Munich, then spent some time in Rome.

In 1879, he moved to Saint Petersburg to work for a publishing house, but his increasing alcoholism ruined his health to the point that his younger brother, who was also a painter, had to bring him home, where he spent his final years living in the residence of the Warsaw Charitable Society. His life was later given fictional treatment in the novel Malaria by Wiktor Gomulicki.

Selected paintings

References

External links 

 Illustrations by Pillati @ the National Museum, Kraków

1832 births
1894 deaths
Polish illustrators
19th-century Polish painters
19th-century Polish male artists
History painters
Artists from Warsaw
Military art
Polish male painters